The name Billie has been used for nine tropical cyclones in the northwest Pacific Ocean.

 Typhoon Billie (1950) (T5039), did not make landfall
 Typhoon Billie (1955) (T5505), struck China
 Typhoon Billie (1959) (T5905, 08W), struck China and Korea
 Typhoon Billie (1961) (T6126, 62W), did not make landfall 
 Tropical Storm Billie (1964) (T6422, 34W, Kayang), struck the Philippines and Vietnam
 Typhoon Billie (1967) (T6707, 07W, Herming), brought heavy rain to Honshū and Kyūshū, Japan
 Typhoon Billie (1970) (T7011, 12W), struck Korea
 Typhoon Billie (1973) (T7303, 04W, Bining), peaked as a Category 4 super typhoon before passing over northeastern China as tropical depression
 Typhoon Billie (1976) (T7613, 13W), struck Taiwan and China

Pacific typhoon set index articles